Yves Blein (born 1954) is a French politician from the department of Rhône. He is a Member of Parliament representing La République En Marche! after being elected to the French National Assembly in Rhône's 14th constituency on 18 June 2017

See also
 2017 French legislative election

References

1954 births
Living people
Deputies of the 14th National Assembly of the French Fifth Republic
Deputies of the 15th National Assembly of the French Fifth Republic
La République En Marche! politicians
21st-century French politicians
Place of birth missing (living people)
Members of Parliament for Rhône